Mystic Warriors-based hardware is an arcade system board used by Konami on several of its action games and fighting games in the early 1990s. Since Konami did not use the word system on most of its arcade hardware, its arcade games are usually classified by the type of video and sound chips used. In this case, the hardware is named after Konami's ninja-themed action game, Mystic Warriors, which debuted the system in 1992.

Specifications of the hardware 
Main CPU: Motorola 68000 @ 16 MHz.
Sound CPU: Zilog Z80 @ 8 MHz
Sound Chip: 2xK054539 @ 18.432 MHz

Games based on the hardware
Mystic Warriors (1992)
Gaiapolis (1993)
Martial Champion (1993)
Metamorphic Force (1993)
Monster Maulers (1993)
Violent Storm (1993)

Video and sound chips 
Note: The chips are followed by their corresponding game(s) in parentheses.

K053246 (all listed games)
K053252 (Gaiapolis, Martial Champion and Mystic Warriors) 
K053936 (Gaiapolis)
K053990 (Martial Champion)
K054000 (Gaiapolis)
K054156 (all listed games)
K054157 (all listed games)
K054338 (Martial Champion, Mystic Warriors and Violent Storm)
K054539 (Martial Champion, Mystic Warriors and Violent Storm)
K054573 (Martial Champion)
K054986 (Martial Champion)
K055550 (Violent Storm)
K055555 (all listed games)
K055673 (all listed games)

See also 
Konami GX
Konami GX400

External links 
Mystic Warriors Based Hardware and Game Information

Konami arcade system boards
68k-based arcade system boards